Gonzalo Daniel Camargo Pinto (born 16 February 1991) is a Uruguayan footballer who plays as a left-back for Montevideo Wanderers.

References

External links
Gonzalo Camargo at playmakerstats.com (English version of ceroacero.es)

1991 births
Living people
Uruguayan footballers
Uruguayan expatriate footballers
Club Plaza Colonia de Deportes players
Juventud de Las Piedras players
C.A. Rentistas players
Rampla Juniors players
Sportivo Cerrito players
Boston River players
Sud América players
Danubio F.C. players
Racing Club de Montevideo players
Venados F.C. players
Atenas de San Carlos players
Defensor Sporting players
Montevideo Wanderers F.C. players
Uruguayan Primera División players
Uruguayan Segunda División players
Ascenso MX players
Association football defenders
Uruguayan expatriate sportspeople in Mexico
Expatriate footballers in Mexico